Locust is a 2015 Russian erotic thriller directed by Egor Baranov.

An extended television version aired on Channel One Russia between 13 and 20 of March 2016.

Plot
Artyom and Lera meet at a seaside resort and have a summer fling. He is a simple guy from the province, a hard worker and a poet; she is a Moscow bohemian girl from a rich family whose parents make all important decisions for her.

The summer goes by quickly and they each go back to their own lives. Lera goes back to Moscow to study and build a career for herself. Later, Artyom follows Lera to the capital, but she is not too happy to see him. Lera gets engaged to her father's friend and business partner, Gurevich. An older rich woman, Natalia, becomes interested in Artyom. At first he rejects her, but later he changes his mind and marries her. Later the romantic affair between Lera and Artyom is resumed and culminates in a series of brutal murders.

Cast
Pyotr Fyodorov as Artyom
Paulina Andreeva as Lera
Dmitri Shevchenko as Gurevich
Yekaterina Volkova as Natalia
Evgeniya Dmitrieva as Irina
Maksim Pinsker as Valentin
Oleksiy Gorbunov as Kavtorang
Aleksander Golubkov as Marat
Yevgeny Stychkin as Patsyfik

Production
The film was shot in Moscow and Odessa.

References

External links
 

Russian thriller drama films
2010s erotic thriller films
2016 Russian television series debuts
Russian television miniseries
Russian drama television series
2015 thriller drama films
Television series by Sreda
2015 drama films
2015 films
Films shot in Moscow
Films shot in Odesa